WUMS (92.1 FM, "Rebel Radio") is a student-run formatted college radio station in University, Mississippi. WUMS is owned and licensed by the Student Media Center of the University of Mississippi (Ole Miss). WUMS covers most of Lafayette County, Mississippi, which includes Oxford, Mississippi and University, Mississippi, with an ERP of 2,900 watts.

Rebel Radio is one of the few commercially licensed college radio stations in the country and is primarily run by students enrolled at Ole Miss.

Programming
WUMS plays top 40 music during the day and hip-hop music at night. The original format of WUMS was a mixture between Hot AC and Rock music until August 2011 when the station changed the format to completely top 40. When this change happened, the station completely rebranded with a new website, new slogan, and new logo.

During the day, student DJs host shows and play their own music. They are typically given a 1-hour time slot per week where they are allowed to host their show. At all other times, the station's computer plays music from the catalog.

DJs
At the beginning of the fall and spring semesters, Rebel Radio hosts auditions for new DJs. To become a DJ, students are required to be enrolled in at least 3 credit hours at the university and have a GPA of at least 2.0.

If accepted, DJs are assigned a weekly time slot where they, and any co-hosts, can come to the studio located in Bishop Hall and perform their show. In the studio, they have the ability to play their own music or music from Rebel Radio's catalog. Each semester, there are usually 40-50 DJs that have shows on Rebel Radio.

DJs do not get paid to host their shows, they are only volunteers. The station can be used as a résumé builder for students, giving them experience for future jobs.

External links

UMS
Freeform radio stations
Contemporary hit radio stations in the United States